Sear Rogers International School, often shortened to "SRIS" is a co-educational international secondary private school. Currently serving around 100 students in Tsuen Wan, it is one of the oldest schools in Hong Kong. Its students take the International General Certificate of Secondary Education (IGCSE) followed by the GCE A/AS-Level.

About
Sear Rogers International School (SRIS) was established in 1982 and has been serving the needs of Hong Kong students ever since. SRIS is a co-educational English medium school for pupils aged 12–19 years (Grades 7 to 13, equivalent to F1 to F7). At Sear Rogers, there is a 1:20 teacher to student ratio. 

The school aims to develop the potential of each student, recognizing that all of its students have a positive contribution to make. Students are encouraged to aim high and contribute to the community in which they will become more independent, and well-equipped to meet challenges.

References

External links
 Official website

International schools in Hong Kong
Kowloon City
Educational institutions established in 1982
1982 establishments in Hong Kong